Alexandria Station is a train station in Alexandria, Ontario, Canada. Located on McDougal Street, it is an intermediate stop for all trains on the Via Rail Ottawa–Montreal line. The station is unstaffed, has a wheelchair accessible shelter and fifteen outdoor parking spaces. In 1994, it became a Designated Heritage Railway Station.

Railway services
As of September 2020, Alexandria station is served by 1 domestic route (with connections) provided by Via Rail, the primary passenger rail operator in Canada. Departures have been reduced to 6 trains per day due to the coronavirus pandemic (effective September 1, 2020).

Ottawa - Quebec

Quebec / Montreal - Ottawa 

 No local service between Québec City, Sainte-Foy and Charny, or Saint-Lambert and Montréal.

See also

 List of designated heritage railway stations of Canada

References

External links

Via Rail stations in Ontario
Canadian National Railway stations in Ontario
Designated heritage railway stations in Ontario
Buildings and structures in the United Counties of Stormont, Dundas and Glengarry